In bifurcation theory, a field within mathematics, a pitchfork bifurcation is a particular type of local bifurcation where the system transitions from one fixed point to three fixed points. Pitchfork bifurcations, like Hopf bifurcations, have two types – supercritical and subcritical. 

In continuous dynamical systems described by ODEs—i.e. flows—pitchfork bifurcations occur generically in systems with symmetry.

Supercritical case

The normal form of the supercritical pitchfork bifurcation is

Subcritical case

The normal form for the subcritical case is

Formal definition
An ODE
 
described by a one parameter function  with  satisfying:
  (f is an odd function),

The form of the pitchfork is given
by the sign of the third derivative:

Note that subcritical and supercritical describe the stability of the outer lines of the pitchfork (dashed or solid, respectively) and are not dependent on which direction the pitchfork faces. For example, the negative of the first ODE above, faces the same direction as the first picture but reverses the stability.

See also 

 Bifurcation theory
 Bifurcation diagram

References
Steven Strogatz, Non-linear Dynamics and Chaos: With applications to Physics, Biology, Chemistry and Engineering, Perseus Books, 2000.
S. Wiggins, Introduction to Applied Nonlinear Dynamical Systems and Chaos, Springer-Verlag, 1990.

Bifurcation theory